Borderline personality disorder (BPD) is a psychological disorder characterized by chronic instability of relationships, self-image, moods, and affect, which is frequently misdiagnosed. This misdiagnosis can come in the form of providing a BPD diagnosis to a person who does not actually meet criteria or providing an incorrect alternative diagnosis in the place of a BPD diagnosis.

Alternative diagnoses 
A misdiagnosis of Borderline Personality Disorder (BPD) can be a result of a number of factors. One of these factors is the overlapping of symptoms between different disorders. As BPD consists of mood instability, Bipolar Disorder is often given as an alternative diagnosis. Additionally, trauma has long been looked at as a component of BPD, and can therefore make the differentiation between Complex Post-Traumatic Stress Disorder and BPD challenging.

Complex post-traumatic stress disorder (C-PTSD) 
Complex post-traumatic stress disorder (C-PTSD) is a diagnosis that was introduced in the International Classification of Diseases, 11th Edition (ICD-11) but is not present in the American Psychiatric Association’s Diagnostic and Statistical Manual 5th edition (DSM-5). C-PTSD is characterized by a combination of previously defined PTSD criteria (reexperiencing, avoidance, and hypervigilance) and criteria unique to C-PTSD (emotional dysregulation, interpersonal difficulties, and negative self-concept). The fact that these unique C-PTSD criteria are also core features of BPD makes the separation of C-PTSD and BPD comorbid with PTSD challenging. An evaluation looking to distinguish the difference between C-PTSD and BPD comorbid with can evaluate factors such as how criteria present differently between these groups. Criteria such as emotional dysregulation presents more often in the form of reactive anger and/or substance use in people with C-PTSD. In contrast, it presents more in the form of self-injury or suicidality amount people with BPD.  Relationship instability presents more as rapid shifting between intense idealization to the belittlement of the relationship among people with BPD. In contrast, people with C-PTSD tend to have relationship instability as a result of not forming a close connection with their partner. As for self-image, people with BPD may have frequent shifts in their self-concept, while people with C-PTSD tend to have a more solidified negative self-image. These major differences offer insight into ways in which C-PTSD can either be incorrectly given instead of BPD comorbid with PTSD or vice versa. This is why it is important for clinicians to have completed a comprehensive evaluation prior to giving either of these diagnoses.

Bipolar disorder (BD) 
Bipolar disorder (BD) is a mood disorder that is characterized by varying degrees of mood swings. BD can further be specified as either Bipolar Disorder I or II. The DSM-5 requires that a person with Bipolar I has experienced at least one manic episode and a person with Bipolar II has experienced at least one hypomanic episode and at least one depressive episode. Both manic and hypomanic episodes consist of "abnormally and persistent elevated, expansive, and irritable mood and...increased goal-directed activity or energy..." While misdiagnosis of BPD in regard to BD can come in both the form of diagnosing someone with BPD who actually has BD or vice versa, the more common occurrence is people being diagnosed with BD who actually better meet criteria for BPD. One study cited that  almost 40% of people who were diagnosed with BPD were provided with a misdiagnosis of BD at some point in their lifetime in comparison to only 10% of people in the general population receiving a misdiagnosis of BD. The exact reasoning for this high rate of misdiagnosis is debated among researchers. Some theories posit that these errors are being made due to the instability of BPD being mistaken for the symptoms of a manic or hypomanic episode. Another study cites the simple ambiguity of BPD criteria as being the reason for misdiagnosis as  people who met more criteria for a BPD diagnosis were less likely to be misdiagnosed with BD.

Consequences of misdiagnosis 
Misdiagnosis of BPD can result in a number of negative consequences. The reasoning for diagnosis is that of debate within the mental health field. Still, it is primarily looked at as serving the function of providing health professionals of the patient's mental health state, to inform treatment approaches, and to aid in accurately reporting successful treatment approaches. Therefore, misdiagnosis can result in outcomes such as not having access to appropriate psychiatric medications or not being provided evidence-based psychological treatment for their disorders.

Medical 
As diagnosis is an essential part of determining what medications to prescribe to a patient or if a patient would benefit from psychopharmacotherapy, being misdiagnosed can have a range of adverse outcomes. Current research has indicated while some prescription medications can help with specific symptoms of BPD, there is no medication proven to decrease BPD symptoms as a whole. In contrast, disorders such as bipolar disorder (BD) have a range of psychiatric medications (e.g., Lithium, anticonvulsants, GABA analogs) being used as a first-line approach to treatment. By providing people with BPD with misdiagnoses such as BD, people with BPD can be subject to receiving medications that will not impact their symptomology and may result in adverse side effects. Alternatively, people who are diagnosed with BPD who may instead have BD or C-PTSD (complex post-traumatic stress disorder) may be deprived of psychopharmacological interventions that would decrease symptoms severity.

Psychological 
Misdiagnosis of BPD can also result in adverse psychological consequences as a diagnosis is used in determining evidence-based treatment approaches used in the therapeutic setting. Treatment approaches such as dialectical behavior therapy and cognitive behavioral therapy for borderline personality disorder are two evidence-based treatments shown to be effective in the treatment of BPD. By providing a misdiagnosis, a person with BPD would likely not have access to these specific treatment approaches, and therefore, their access to evidence-based treatment for their BPD would be delayed until an accurate diagnosis is given.

References 

Borderline personality disorder
Medical diagnosis
Medical error